Rhododendron mucronulatum, the Korean rhododendron or Korean rosebay (RR: Jindalrae), is a rhododendron species native to Korea, Mongolia, Russia, and parts of northern China. The reddish-purple flowers appear in late winter or early spring, often on the bare branches before the foliage unfurls.

The Latin specific epithet mucronulatum means "sharply pointed", referring to the leaf shape.

Cultivation
The cultivar 'Cornell Pink' has light pink flowers, and has gained the Royal Horticultural Society's Award of Garden Merit. It is hardy down to  but like most rhododendron species requires a sheltered position in dappled shade with acid soil that has been enriched with leaf mould.

Culinary use 
In Korea, the flowers are used in pan-fried flower cakes called hwajeon, which are traditional for Samjinnal, a spring festival. It is also used in infused liquor.

Gallery

References 

 "Rhododendron mucronulatum", Turczaninow, Bull. Soc. Imp. Naturalistes Moscou. 10(7): 155. 1837.
 Plants of the World Online

mucronulatum
Flora of Eastern Asia
Flora of China
Flora of Mongolia
Flora of Russia
Flora of Japan
Taxa named by Nikolai Turczaninow